A campus credential, more commonly known as a campus card or a campus ID card is an identification document certifying the status of students, faculty, staff or other constituents as members of the institutional community and eligible for access to services and resources. Campus credentials are typically valid for the duration of a student's enrollment or an employee's service.

History 
In 1993, the National Association of Campus Card Users (NACCU) board held its first board meeting at Duke University. The board was composed of thought leaders from Loyola College, Duke University, SUNY Geneseo, and Florida State University. Their vision was to create an organization with the purpose of educating college and university administrators charged with the responsibility for developing card systems by apprising them of newly installed applications, vendor performance, technology platforms, and other matters relating to the marketplace for card systems (National Association of Campus Card Users, n.d.). 

Today NACCU consists of campus credential professionals from colleges and universities around the world. NACCU provides its members with opportunities such as webinars, annual conferences, a resource vault, listserv, program assessment resources, and the CampusIDNews publication (formerly CR80News). Membership and activities for NACCU have continued to grow over the years.

Purpose 
In today's complex campus environment, delivery of critical services such as building access, financial transactions, and privilege-based functions (i.e. meal plans, library and recreation facility services, etc.), is dependent on campus credential programs which bring together multiple constituencies, systems, hardware, services, and applications spanning the entire campus community using a single identity (Lv, 2013). Many institutions utilize access control paradigms that assign and revoke access based on structured, reproducible rules tied to their identity management systems (McKee, 2021). The functions of a campus credential program are complex and touch many parts of the campus beyond just the provision of the credential. 

Campus credential programs are part of a complex regulatory environment and help institutions comply with laws and policies. Staff who lead these centralized efforts must be knowledgeable of and adhere to multiple institutional/state/provincial/federal regulations such as FERPA, HIPAA, GDPR, PCI DSS/EMV compliance, Red Flag Rules, federal or provincial data privacy laws (Thomas, 2020). Campus credential programs are subject to internal financial and technology audits and internal control assessments.

Campus credential programs can influence and reinforce a sense of belonging for students and other stakeholders. Campus credential professionals need to recognize the impact that a credential and the policies surrounding the credential and its usage can have in shaping a user’s experience. This impact can be particularly salient in helping historically marginalized identities feel a sense of connection and affirmation to a campus environment.  For example, the campus credential can play a role in creating a supportive environment in working with the LGBTQ+ community and transitioning students, international students and other populations. Policies dealing with names-in-use/chosen names, pronouns, or other identifying information have an impact on how users navigate the institutional environment, as well as how and where a credential can be used outside of the institution.

Campus credential programs play a supporting role in student health and well-being by enabling university administrators to understand if students are attending class, using dining services, and remaining active with campus academics and campus activities (Kruger et al., 2017). New legislation is pending in the US Senate to require physical credentials (campus cards) to print mental health resources, including the National Suicide Prevention Hotline number, on the back (Hudson, 2021).

Functions 
The functions of the campus credential, in addition to data storage for the student's identification, vary by University. Some examples of campus credential functions are:

 Building access (Classroom, Residence Halls, Recreational Facilities, Libraries, Dining Facilities, Lockers, etc.)
 Equipment access (Computers, Copy machines, Printers, etc.)
 Transportation access (Campus and/or Public Transportation, Parking Permits, Ride Sharing, Bike Rentals, etc.)
 Cashless payment for Dining, Vending, Laundry, and at campus retail locations
 Mobile banking
 Library card
 Time and attendance control
 Exam registration
 Mobile phone and NFC Services

Campus credentials with multiple functions can help simplify internal administrative processes.

Technology 
Electronic card access has been available on campuses since as early as 1968. Early versions, such as the “VALI-DINE” system at Rochester Institute of Technology, relied on cards with mechanically punched holes to allow access to their dining halls. In the years following, the use of campus credentials and technology has matured.  In 1972, California State Polytechnic University installed the first known card-based system utilizing magnetic stripe technology. By 1985, the Harco multi-application, campus-wide system utilizing bar code, Prox contact-based chips and magnetic stripe technology was implemented by Duke University. Technological advances continued to pick up speed with both cashless payment systems introduced by Debitek Inc. and copy machine management introduced by DANYL Corporation in 1986. By the 1990s, universities began linking their campus cards to banks, with Florida State University being the first in 1990. DataCard introduced its first color digital imaging card production system in 1993. In 2001, contactless chip technology cards were introduced and CBORD released the first IP-addressable card reader for campus credential access systems. (Huber, 2007). Technology continued to ramp up, with cloud-based Campus Credential systems growing in popularity in 2005. By 2015, the use of smart devices instead of physical cards soared. And by 2020, wearable credentials, such as wristbands and fobs, gained popularity, along with mobile apps and digital wallets to manage credential functionality (Huber, n.d.).  

Today, mobile credential technology is transforming the ways in which students manage their campus experience. The introduction of the campus credential available via Apple and Android smart devices is changing the way students access buildings and pay for goods and services. Mobile credentials build upon generational shifts that impact how students experience their world, communicate, and interact socially (Jaworowski, 2020). By meeting students where they are in terms of technology, the campus credential program can improve student engagement.

Trends 
Credential programs connect different parts of the campus community around the concept of access. They are increasingly in the forefront of major campus issues, such as the impact of  a pandemic. Universities are able to leverage campus credentials to enforce access policies based on testing, symptom monitoring and vaccination status (Duke University, n.d.). COVID-19 has driven the change to mobile credentials to more of a priority as institutions seek ways to provide a frictionless/touchless/self-service means of providing access and identifying people on our campuses.

Beyond the campus environment, campus credentials can be used as voter identification (Hudson, 2019). For example, the State of Alabama accepts the mobile credential as a valid ID for voting if issued by a State of Alabama college or university (Alabama Secretary of State, n.d.). Campus credentials are also accepted as secondary identification by the US State Department for passport application (Travel.state.gov, n.d.).

Campus credential programs have evolved to be essential enterprise systems for campus operations. The business model for campus credential programs is evolving from “plastic card factories” to virtual campus customer service centers offering 24/7 services to stay relevant with technology advances, remote learning and working, and dramatic shifts in generational expectations (Huber, 2017).

International perspective
As with US/Canadian institutions, the campus card remains the anchor method for student identification in European Higher Education Institutes (HEIs). There is a growing trend among campus administrators and students for the use of hybrid solutions that involve both the campus card and mobile devices to provide campus credentials. In the near future, it is anticipated that fully mobile credentials will be outpace demands for physical credentials, although various mobile devices vendors’ and manufacturers’ ecosystems are currently a barrier as they do not following standardized and homogenized solutions. Both Europe and US/Canada institutions are focused on identification and payments, either at canteens, transportation, discounts, etc. Off-campus, the primary focus is on transportation, student discounts and proof of student status.

Academic mobility is the practice of students and teachers in higher education moving to another institution inside or outside of their own country to study or teach for a limited time. This concept is driving research into the development of a credential which can be used across Europe to provide identification and authentication of students across borders. The primary goal of the European Campus Card Association (ECCA) is to promote the concept of a European Student Card and support the work of the European Commission in this area. ECCA is actively engaged with the European Commission through various research projects to develop a common European Student Card that will support the Erasmus programme. ECCA has recently published a research report on a European Student eID Framework Proposal (ECCA Student eID Framework, 2021). Other research projects ECCA is currently involved in includes ECX-tension (Nealon, 2022).

See also

 Academic mobility network
 Barcode
 Card printer
 Erasmus Programme
 Identification document
 International Student Identity Card (Complementary)
 List of campus identifications in mobile wallets
 Magnetic Stripe
 MIFARE
 Multi-factor authentication
 Near-field communication
 Personal identification number
 Proximity card
 RFID
 Smartcard

References
 National Association of Campus Card Users. (n.d.) "About NACCU".
 Lv, Weichun (2013). "Design of Campus Smart Card System". Proceedings of the 2nd International Symposium on Computer, Communication, Control and Automation. doi:10.2991/isccca.2013.120. ISBN 978-90-78677-63-5. S2CID 44239953.
 McKee, Mary K. "Policy-Based Access Controls". ID Pro Body of Knowledge, Volume 1, Issue 4, 2021. 
 Thomas, Dawn. The Evolution of the Campus ID Card". College Services Magazine, Spring 2020.
 Kruger, Kevin. "Student Success: Mission-Critical". Rebecca Martin, George Mehaffy, John O'Brien. Educause Review. May 8, 2017.
 Hudson, Andrew. "New Senate Bill Could Require ALL Campus Cards to Feature Mental Health Resources". CR80News. January 22, 2021.
 Huber, Robert C. "A Brief History of the Campus Card Industry". CR80News. March 28, 2007.
 Huber, Robert C. and Associates. (n.d.) "Campus Card Technology Evolution (1960-2020)".
 Jaworowski, Caitlin. "Embracing Z Generation". College Services Magazine, Spring 2020.
 Duke University. (n.d.) "Symptom Monitoring – Duke United".
 Hudson, Andrew. "NC Colleges Weight Campus Cards for Voter ID". CR80News. March 1, 2019.
 Alabama Secretary of State.  (n.d.) "Valid ID at the Polls".
 Travel.state.gov. (n.d.) "Photo Identification: Secondary IDs".
 Huber, Robert C. "The Campus Card Factory: Time for a New Business Model". University Business. April 13, 2017.
 Nealon, Sinead (Executive Director at European Campus Card Association) Email to Laurie Harris. August 23, 2022.
 ECCA Student eID Framework. Research, State-of-the-Art & Survey Findings Report. November 2021.

External links
European Campus Card Association
National Association of Campus Card Users
ESC-tension

Identity documents
Campuses